Antonín Byczanski (born 1887, date of death unknown) was a Czech sports shooter. He competed for Czechoslovakia in two events at the 1924 Summer Olympics.

References

External links
 
 

1887 births
Year of death missing
Czech male sport shooters
Olympic shooters of Czechoslovakia
Shooters at the 1924 Summer Olympics
Place of birth missing